Johan Wilhelm Francois Klopper (born 4 October 1972) is a South African former cricketer.

Klopper was born at Grahamstown in October 1972. He made his debut for Border in List A one-day cricket against Easterns in the 1997/98 Standard Bank League. He played one-day cricket for Border until the 2000/01 Standard Bank Cup, making a total of nine one-day appearances. He took 4 wickets in these matches, as well as scoring 24 runs. He made just a single appearance for Border in first-class cricket against Easterns in the 2000/01 SuperSport Series. He played later minor counties cricket in England for Oxfordshire, making a single appearance against Herefordshire in the 2007 Minor Counties Championship.

References

External links

1972 births
Living people
People from Makhanda, Eastern Cape
South African cricketers
Border cricketers
Oxfordshire cricketers
Cricketers from the Eastern Cape